New Town Utopia is a 2018 documentary feature film about the British new town experiment. It is an alternative social history of the Essex town of Basildon, including interviews and performances from artists, poets and musicians of the town.

Plot 
The poetic narrative of the film explores topics including: the flawed utopian ambition of post-war planning and design, social housing and the impact of Thatcher's right-to-buy policy; the neglect of creative and cultural facilities by national and local government; and the demonisation of working-class people by the British media.

Release 
New Town Utopia was released theatrically the UK on 4 May 2018. It was directed by British filmmaker Christopher Ian Smith and executive produced by Margaret Matheson (Scum, Sid and Nancy, Sleep Furiously). It features actor Jim Broadbent (Iris, Topsy-Turvy, Moulin Rouge!) as the voice of Lewis Silkin MP. Hippy Joe Hymas of the band Hayseed Dixie also features.

Reception 
It was well received by critics and audiences. It has  Fresh rating on Rotten Tomatoes. The Guardian's Peter Bradshaw called it an "Unapologetically upbeat film in which utopianism is taken unexpectedly seriously. Absorbing and heartening." The Times review said it was "Consistently fascinating, unfolds like a warning from history'.

Cast
Jim Broadbent
Terry Bird
Vincent O'Connell
Joe Morgan
Ralph Dartford
Sue Ryder Paget
Mike Parker
Kath Joyce-Banks
Shaun Badham
Vin Harrop
Penny Betteridge
Rob Marlow
Tim Williams
Pat Joyce
Stuart Brown
Phil Burdett
Richard Lee
Richard Hawkins
Marc Barnacle
Ölmo Lazarus
Steve Waters
Barry Hayes
”Hippy” Joe Hymas

References

External links
 
 
New Town Utopia on Rotten Tomatoes

British documentary films
2018 documentary films
2018 films
2010s English-language films
2010s British films